Hichki is a 2018 Indian Hindi-language comedy drama film co-written and directed by Siddharth P. Malhotra and produced by Aditya Chopra and Maneesh Sharma under the former's banner of Yash Raj Films. Based on American motivational speaker Brad Cohen's autobiography Front of the Class, it stars Rani Mukerji in her comeback appearance as Naina Mathur, an aspiring teacher who was rejected by many schools because of her Tourette syndrome until she is accepted at the St. Notker's School, her alma mater. She is assigned to teach students from a nearby slum in the class 9F, which was created by the Government of India to fill a quota for the underprivileged.

Malhotra struggled to find a studio to finance Hichki, since the film, which had begun scripting in 2013 after he acquired the rights to Front of the Class, was felt to lack potential for the box office. Chopra and Sharma later insisted on producing Hichki with Malhotra as director. Principal photography was handled by Avinash Arun and took place in Mumbai between April and June 2017, with Meenal Agarwal as the art director and Vaibhavi Merchant providing the choreography. The film was edited by Shweta Venkat Matthew. Jasleen Royal and Hitesh Sonik composed the soundtrack and background score, respectively.

Hichki was released on 23 March 2018. It received mixed reviews, with praise mostly directed towards Mukerji's performance but criticism towards the plot's predictability. She received nominations for Best Actress at the Filmfare Awards, International Indian Film Academy Awards, Screen Awards, and Zee Cine Awards, and won an award of the same category at the Indian Film Festival of Melbourne, where it was screened. The film was also shown at the International Film Festival of India, the Shanghai International Film Festival, and the Giffoni Film Festival.

Plot 
Naina Mathur, a Bachelor of Education and Master of Science, wants to be a teacher, but is repeatedly rejected as she suffers from Tourette syndrome, which causes her to make uncontrollable sounds likened to hiccups. Despite failing for five years, she is supported by her mother Sudha and her younger brother Vinay, while her father Prabhakar sees little potential in the idea and wants her to take a banking job. Naina eventually receives an offer at the St. Notker's School to teach the class 9F. Once she is inducted as a teacher, however, she realizes that the school was desperate to find a new teacher for 9F, as all other teachers had failed to control the class. Naina finds that the students are unruly, misbehaved, and visibly different. Shyamlal, the school's peon, tells her that the 9F students come from a nearby slum and were admitted to fill the government-prescribed quota for the underprivileged after a previous municipality school on the St. Notker's football ground was closed due to mounting maintenance costs.

On her first day, Naina's students imitate and mock her. She decides to teach them interactively, determined to show resilience. The students prank her with liquid nitrogen which explodes, shattering the windows. Naina prevents a mass expulsion by saying that the prank required planning, and if that can be guided, the class has potential. Wadia, the teacher of 9A, dislikes the 9F students. He tells her that his class comprises academically excellent prefects, but she asserts that her students will earn prefect badges as well. The school's annual science fair project is assigned to 9A. Meanwhile, Naina teaches her students to be brave in pursuing knowledge and to realise their individual strengths. Aatish, the sole student who remains cold towards Naina, sabotages 9A's project. This is discovered by Wadia, and the principal decides to expel 9F. Again, Naina prevents it by promising that they will pass their exams, but is unable to prevent their suspension from attending school until then. Dejected, she tells them they have shattered her attempt to help them.

Aatish faces ridicule from the rest of 9F and decides to apologize to Naina, and all of the 9F students study diligently. Shyamlal then supplies Aatish copies of the question paper so they would cheat. When he presents them to his classmates, they refuse and he gives up on the idea as well. After the exam days, they pass but are accused of cheating when Shyamlal confesses to the plan, and the principal decides to expel them during the prefect-pinning ceremony. Akshay reveals to Wadia that it was he who had bribed Shyamlal to supply 9F copies of the wrong question paper, and Wadia realises that 9F did not cheat. At the ceremony, Wadia announces that he wrongfully tried to fail the students and applauds Naina's teaching, asking her to pin the prefect badges to her students who ranked first. The film ends with Naina's last day at the school after serving for 25 years, retiring as the school principal, as her former 9F students, who are all now successful, reunite with her.

Cast 
 Rani Mukerji as Naina Mathur
 Naisha Khanna as young Naina
 Supriya Pilgaonkar as Sudha Mathur
 Sachin Pilgaonkar as Naina's father
 Hussain Dalal as Vinay
 Vir Bhanushali as young Vinay
 Neeraj Kabi as Wadia
 Vikram Gokhale as Khan
 Harsh Mayar as Aatish
 Asif Basra as a school peon
 Riya Shukla as Tara
 Sparsh Khanchandani as Oru
 Poorti Jai Agarwal as Tamanna
 Shagufta Shaikh as Shagufta
 Vikrant Soni as Killam
 Jayesh Kardak as Pankaj
 Benjamin Yangal as Ashwin
 Kalaivanan Kannan as Kalai
 Swaraj Kumar as Ravinder
 Siddhesh Pardhi as Omnish
 Rohit Suresh Saraf as Akshay
 Jannat Zubair Rahmani as Natasha
 Shiv Kumar Subramaniam as the school principal

Production 

In 2013, Siddharth P. Malhotra acquired the rights to Brad Cohen's 2005 autobiography Front of the Class and started writing the screenplay along with Ambar Hadap and Ganesh Pandit, with Ankur Chaudhry and Raaj Mehta joining them later. The film was titled Hichki, which Malhotra felt was a suitable word for describing prejudice and social stigma against Tourette disorder. His second directorial venture after We Are Family (2010), Malhotra had several failed attempts to find a production house over four years. According to him, the production houses believed that the film lacked commercial viability, telling him: "Who would watch the story of a teacher suffering from Tourette syndrome?" His wife, Sapna, suggested Yash Raj Films to him, although he was initially reluctant as he had faced many rejections. He met the company's owner Aditya Chopra to narrate the screenplay, and the latter liked it. Chopra, however, was busy with his project Befikre (2016) and asked Maneesh Sharma, who would co-produce Hichki with him, to listen to the rest.

While Malhotra had conceived of the film as a male-led film when writing the screenplay, Sharma suggested casting an actress as the lead. Rani Mukerji was chosen, marking her first acting role since Mardaani in 2014. She revealed that she accepted the film because she found the role to be more challenging than those in her previous films. Furthermore, Mukerji has said that it was Chopra who conceived her to portray the part as he saw Mukerji becoming obsessed with her family life and that her fans were desperately waiting for her comeback. She waited until her daughter Adira was four months old before accepting the role. In preparation, she interacted with Cohen (who was happy knowing the film would address Tourette syndrome and the character is based on him) on the social media platform Skype, asking him for training to make her character's motor and vocal tics appear spontaneous and not rehearsed. Shanoo Sharma subsequently completed the casting.

Principal photography started in Mumbai on 4 April 2017. Avinash Arun worked as the cinematographer, with Vaibhavi Merchant doing the choreography and Meenal Agarwal finishing the production design. Shilpa Makhija and Varsha Chandanani designed the costumes. Because this was her first on-screen project since her daughter's birth, Mukerji confessed that she was worried about leaving her daughter for the first time. Mukerji added, "... she had not spent even one day without me. Also, I was wondering whether I would be able to act or not as I was facing the camera after two years. I wondered if I still have it in me." The shooting finished on 5 June 2017, and the film was then edited by Shweta Venkat Matthew at Mehboob Studio. Hitesh Sonik composed the background score, and Pritam Das served as the sound designer along with Ganesh Gangadharan.

Soundtrack 

The soundtrack to Hichki was composed by Jasleen Royal and the lyrics were written by Raj Shekhar, Jaideep Sahni, Neeraj Rajawat, Aditya Sharma, and David Klyton. Abhishek Kurme, Arijit Singh, Benny Dayal, David Klyton, Harshdeep Kaur, Jasleen Royal, Naina Kundu, Nigel Rajaratnam, Rhiya Jauhari, Shilpa Rao, Siddesh Jammi, and Yogesh Kurme performed the vocals. The album was released by Yash Raj Films' subsidiary YRF Music on 19 February 2018.

The album received a mixed reception. Devansh Sharma from Firstpost wrote that Royal has delivered a good performance by composing it with "due care and translates into seamless fun by the time it reaches the audience". Debarati S. Sen of The Times of India concluded that the album is "a fun, light and breezy album, that sounds promising and is worth a hear". In a review published by Scroll.in, Devarsi Ghosh felt that the album was mediocre, likening it to a hot mug of coffee with milk and sugar in it that is "never too bland or too out-there". Joginder Tuteja of Bollywood Hungama was ambivalent of the album, rating it two stars, and said that he expected Hichki to be a songless film. The Indian Express Suanshu Khurana believed many of its bits are repetitive.

Release and reception

Marketing and release 

Hichki was one of the most anticipated Bollywood films of 2018 as the film marked the acting comeback of Mukerji after four years. She promoted it on television in five languages: Bengali, Bhojpuri, Hindi, Marathi, and Punjabi. According to her, the film has inspired her by its moral message and relevancy, saying that she wanted more people in the country to hear it as well. The trailer was released on 19 December 2017. The first poster for the film was released by the critic and trade analyst Taran Adarsh on his Twitter account on 26 December, showing a release date of 23 February 2018; Ritika Handoo from Zee News thought that Mukerji's pose on it was impressive. However, another poster came out on 1 February 2018 and the release date was postponed to 23 March. Sharma said that it was delayed because Indian student exams were starting around the first date.

The promotion of Hichki started on 14 January 2018, during the celebration of Makar Sankranti. Mukerji went to Ahmedabad to interact with school students and her fans, and later to eight other cities. She also did promotion on several television shows, including Bigg Boss 11, Dadagiri Unlimited, and Dance India Dance. Mukerji continued it by interacting with the spiritual teacher Ravi Shankar at the inaugural session of the International Women's Conference. She spoke of her experience, "It will be amazing to be part of this session and hear him speak. Hichki is all about harnessing your positivity and inner peace to bring out the best in you and I'm going to speak about this in his presence. I look forward to this interactive session." In October, Mukerji visited five cities in China (Beijing, Chengdu, Guangzhou, Shanghai, and Shenzhen) to promote the film there.

Hichki premiered on 23 March 2018 with the tagline, "What is life without a few hiccups". It was released on DVD in the NTSC widescreen format on 8 May, and premiered on television on 26 May. The film was screened at the Shanghai International Film Festival on 15 June, the Indian Film Festival of Melbourne on 11 August, the International Film Festival of India in November, and the Giffoni Film Festival in July 2019. Malhotra told the Press Trust of India that the festival screenings were an honour for him and an opportunity to boost his career. The film was released in theatres in China on 12 October with the title Teacher with Hiccup. It was released in Taiwan as My Teacher with Hiccups on 2 November. Hichki is available for streaming on Amazon Prime Video and Apple TV+.

Critical response 
The film was met with generally average reviews from critics; most of the praise focused on Mukerji, while the plot faced the greatest criticism. The entertainment portal Bollywood Hungama said that Mukerji had delivered an effervescent performance and made Hichki a good film despite a predictable story, believing she would make the audience empathise with her character and that the actress portrayed it zestfully. In her two-and-a-half-star review, Sukanya Verma of Rediff.com panned the melodramatic screenplay but appreciated Mukerji and described the film as an "out-and-out" show for her. Mayank Shekhar, writing for Mid-Day, was critical of the film, calling it the desi version of the American coming-of-age drama Dead Poets Society (1989). Filmfare critic Devesh Sharma thought Mukerji looked as if she had not taken a sabbatical from full-time acting, lauding her dramatic confrontational scenes with Neeraj Kabi, and Bhawana Somaaya expressed appreciation of her for playing against type.

Reviewing for The Times of India, Rachit Gupta said that she hoped the film focused not only on Naina's classroom struggle but also on her personal life, especially her conflict with her father. She, however, commended the performances of Mukerji and the actors who played her students, particularly that from Harsh Mayar. Rajeev Masand of News18 found Hichki to be inconsistent and unoriginal; however, he praised the film's moral message. In the words of NDTV's Saibal Chatterjee, "Rani Mukerji's energetic, engaging performance apart, Hichki is a huff-and-puff show marked by too much mush and fuss. But it has just enough to keep tearjerker junkies interested." From the Hindustan Times, Rohit Vats rated the film two-and-a-half stars, complimenting Mukerji's straightforward, confident performance and those of Kabi and the student actors. However, Vats was disappointed that the film only revolves on the relationship between a teacher and students.

Richard James Havis of South China Morning Post found Mukerji's spirited performance enhancing an otherwise predictable story. Udita Jhunjhunwala of Scroll.in appreciated Malhotra for putting the narrative focus on Naina only without disruptive subplots, and Samrudhi Ghosh of India Today observed that Malhotra "had a tough task at hand—to stay away from emotional manipulation, even in the dramatic moments. He succeeds, for the most part; although some portions of the film, such as the climax, feel a little contrived." Another review in News18, written by Kriti Tulsiani, commented that the film is a remake of Peter Werner's 2008 film Front of the Class, which was based on the same book as Hichki, and criticised it for the inability to provide an original story and undramatic ending. In the Deccan Chronicle, Rohit Bhatnagar, who gave the film three out of five stars, wrote that Mukerji drives the film with her effortless performance; although the latter aspect make the film mediocre, he added that Hichki is as good as Malhotra's We Are Family. From the Daily News and Analysis, Chaya Unnikrishnan termed Hichki a slice-of-life film with inspiring themes and was impressed by Mukerji's acting.

Namrata Joshi praised her tics used in the right measure and time, but noted the actors cast as her parents (Sachin and Supriya Pilgaonkar) did not get enough scope. Raja Sen and Aditya Shrikrishna from The New Indian Express said Mukerji was successful at making her tics look natural, and Anna M. M. Vetticad described the actress as one of the "biggest strengths" of Hichki. Billing it as a comeback vehicle for Mukerji, The Indian Express Shalini Langer acclaimed Malhotra for not adding romantic songs or sequences. The Tamil magazine Ananda Vikatan named it as the best example of what teachers should teach to their students, with Anupama Chopra summarising, "[It] is a genuinely earnest film made with heart. But it doesn't take enough risks and consequently doesn't touch a raw nerve in the way that Taare Zameen Par did. But it's always nice to see a talented actress with all guns blazing." Swetha Ramakrishnan of Firstpost claimed Hichki would be not complete if Kabi did not feature in it.

Box office 
The film was a commercial success in India and abroad, with the trade analyst Girish Johar telling The Indian Express that its business largely relied on the audience's word-of-mouth. However, he added that the issue of Tourette syndrome that is addressed in it may limit the audience. Released in more than 900 theatres, the film had a below average opening in India, grossing . After earning  in only five days, however, it was declared a commercial success, and Sharma expressed his appreciation by saying that he was motivated to produce more films with "universally-appealing" themes. Hichki collected  over its theatrical run in India. Globally, the film collected , most of which came from Chinese markets, where it grossed ¥120 million.

Awards and nominations

See also 

 List of highest-grossing Indian films by international revenue

References

External links 
 
 

2010s Hindi-language films
2018 comedy-drama films
Films set in Mumbai
Films shot in Mumbai
Indian comedy-drama films
Films about Tourette syndrome
Yash Raj Films films